The Second International Congress on Education of the Deaf was an international conference of deaf educators held in Milan, Italy in 1880. It is commonly known as "the Milan Conference or Milan Congress". The first meeting was held in Paris in 1878. Joseph Marius Magnat, a former oralist educator from Switzerland, received a wealthy donation to organize a larger meeting two years later. After deliberations from September 6 to 11, 1880, the conference declared that oral education (oralism) was superior to manual education and passed a resolution banning the use of sign language in school. After its passage in 1880, schools in European countries and the United States switched to using speech therapy without sign language as a method of education for the deaf. A formal apology was made by the board at the 21st International Congress on Education of the Deaf in Vancouver, BC, Canada, in 2010 accepting the dangerous ramifications of such ban as an act of discrimination and violation of human and constitutional rights.

Background 

Alexander Graham Bell and Edward Miner Gallaudet, both prominent U.S. figures in deaf education, had been debating the effectiveness of oral-only education versus an education that utilizes sign language as a means of visual communication, culminating in the Milan Conference in 1880 that passed eight resolutions on deaf education.

The Second International Congress on Education of the Deaf (which, despite its name, was actually the first) was an international meeting of deaf educators from at least seven countries. There were five delegates from America and approximately 164 delegates total in attendance. The Congress was planned and organized by a committee created by the Pereire Society, a group that was against sign language. More than half of the people invited were known oralists; therefore, the Congress was biased and most, if not all, of the resolutions that were voted on by the delegates gave results in favor of the oral method. Many of the resolutions were worded in ways that supported the oral method, such as "Considering the incontestable superiority of speech over signs in restoring the deaf-mute to society, and in giving him a more perfect knowledge of language,/Declares –/That the Oral method ought to be preferred that of signs for the education and instruction of the deaf and dumb".

The Milan Conference was organized by the Pereire Society, an organization formed by the family of Jacob Rodrigues Pereira of France and financed by their numerous railroad and bank holdings (including the Société Générale du Crédit Mobilier). The Pereire Society was a strong supporter of oralism. They organized the Milan conference with the intent to ban sign language. They secured this outcome by carefully selecting who was invited, inviting the delegates to see the oralist success in a local school, and by encouraging negative reactions to those giving speeches supporting sign language and cheering those supporting oralism.

Delegates 

The Milan Conference was attended by 164 delegates of various countries. Out of these 164 delegates only one, James Denison, was Deaf. The conference president was Abbe Giulio Tarra.

The Nationality of the remaining delegates is unknown. The five U.S. delegates present were James Denison, Edward Miner Gallaudet, Reverend Thomas Gallaudet, Isaac Lewis Peet and Charles A Stoddard.

Conference 

The Conference was held in the Regio Instituto Tenico di Santa Martha, Milan. It was held from 6 September to 11 September 1880. The aim of the conference was to ban sign language from deaf education. During the conference there were 12 speakers who gave their opinions on the issues connected with deaf education. Nine of the twelve speakers gave an oralist view, and three (the Gallaudet brothers, and Richard Elliot, a teacher from England) supported the use of sign language.

Eight resolutions 

1. The Convention, considering the incontestable superiority of articulation over signs in restoring the deaf-mute to society and giving him a fuller knowledge of language, declares that the oral method should be preferred to that of signs in education and the instruction of deaf-mutes.
Passed 160 to 4

2. The Convention, considering that the simultaneous use of articulation and signs has the disadvantage of injuring articulation and lip-reading and the precision of ideas, declares that the pure oral method should be preferred.
Passed 150 to 16

3. Considering that a great number of the deaf and dumb are not receiving the benefit of instruction, and that this condition is owing to the impotence of families and of institutions, recommends that governments should take the necessary steps that all the deaf and dumb may be educated.
Passed unanimously.

4. Considering that the teaching of the speaking deaf by the Pure Oral method should resemble as much as possible that of those who hear and speak, declares 
a) That the most natural and effectual means by which the speaking deaf may acquire the knowledge of language is the "intuitive" method, viz., that which consists in setting forth, first by speech, and then by writing the objects and the facts which are placed before the eyes of the pupils.
b) That in the first, or maternal, period the deaf-mute ought to be led to the observation of grammatical forms by means of examples and of practical exercises, and that in the second period he ought to be assisted to deduce from these examples the grammatical rules, expressed with the utmost simplicity and clearness.
c) That books, written with words and in forms of language known to the pupil, can be put into his hands at any time.
Motion carried.

5. Considering the want of books sufficiently elementary to help the gradual and progressive development of language, recommends that the teachers of the Oral system should apply themselves to the publication of special works on the subject.
Motion carried.

6. Considering the results obtained by the numerous inquiries made concerning the deaf and dumb of every age and every condition long after they had quit school, who, when interrogated upon various subjects, have answered correctly, with sufficient clearness of articulation, and read the lips of their questioners with the greatest facility, declares:
a) That the deaf and dumb taught by the Pure Oral method do not forget after leaving school the knowledge which they have acquired there, but develop it still further by conversation and reading, when have been made so easy for them.
b) That in their conversation with speaking persons they make use exclusively of speech.
c) That speech and lip-reading so far from being lost, are developed by practice.
Motion carried.

7. Considering that the education of the deaf and dumb by speech has peculiar requirements; considering also that the experienced of teachers of deaf-mutes is almost unanimous, declares
a) That the most favourable age for admitting a deaf child into school is from eight to ten years.
b) That the school term ought to be seven years at least; but eight years would be preferable.
c) That no teacher can effectually teach a class of more than ten children on the Pure Oral method.
Motion carried.

8. Considering that the application of the Pure Oral method in institutions where it is not yet in active operation, should be to avoid the certainty of failure prudent, gradual, progressive, recommends 
a) That the pupils newly received into the schools should form a class by themselves, where instruction could be given by speech.
b) That these pupils should be absolutely separated from others too far advanced to be instructed by speech, and whose education will be completed by signs.
c) That each year a new speaking class be established, until all the old pupils taught by signs have completed their education.
Motion carried.

Opposition 

Delegates from the United States and Britain were the only ones who opposed the use of oralism as a sole method of instruction, but were unsuccessful in their efforts at the congress. Edward Miner Gallaudet and Reverend Thomas Gallaudet were among the protesters who fought against the oralist method. Since failing to overturn the Milan resolutions, Gallaudet ensured that the United States would not be completely converted to oralism-only, which included allowing high school students in institutes for the deaf to use sign language and maintaining Gallaudet College (now Gallaudet University) as a university that permits full usage of sign language.

The National Association of the Deaf was formed in the United States one month before the Milan Conference took place, and was dedicated toward preserving American Sign Language.

First repudiation 100 years later in Hamburg 

At the 15th International Congress on the Education of the Deaf (ICED) held in Hamburg, West Germany in 1980, the first major precedent for the repudiation of the 1880 resolutions was set by a large group of attendees who rejected the 1880 resolutions in practical-moral terms by the method of informal consensus in deciding that the 1880 resolutions had no appropriate standing, originally, in 1880. As explained by Richard G. Brill: "At the International Congress in Hamburg in 1980, however, the Milan resolutions were challenged head-on in major professional addresses at the opening of the congresses. It was recognized and accepted that resolutions concerning methodology were not appropriate at such international congresses because of the unlikelihood that the delegates fully represented the practices and philosophies of their home countries." Rather than seek to directly overturn the 1880s resolutions, the Congress put forward "Recommendations" for informational purposes, including the following: "Recommended that this International Congress on Education of the Deaf, in convocation gathered at Hamburg, West Germany, in August 1980, affirms and declares that all deaf children have the right to flexible communication in the mode or combination of modes which best meets their individual needs." Sharkey and Hikins deemed this Recommendation, along with the others, as constituting overturning the 1880 Milan Congress's resolutions.

In spite of the previous precedent set in 1980, in July 2010 in Vancouver, Canada, the board of the 21st International Congress on the Education of the Deaf (ICED) formally voted to reject all of the 1880 Milan resolutions.

See also 

 Deaf
 Deaf culture
 Deaf education
 History of deaf education
 History of deaf education in the United States
 Deaf studies
 Sign language

Other international congresses were held in the following cities:
Paris, 1878; 
Milan, 1880; 
Brussels, 1883; 
Chicago, 1893; 
Paris, 1900; 
Liège, Belgium, 1905; 
Edinburgh, 1907; 
London, 1925; 
West Trenton, New Jersey, United States, 1933; 
Groningen, 1950; 
Manchester, United Kingdom, 1958; 
Washington, DC, 1963; 
Stockholm, 1970; 
Tokyo, 1975; and
Hamburg, 1980.

References 
 Citations

 Bibliography
 Cleve, J.V.V and Crouch, B.A (1989) "A Place of Their Own – Creating Deaf Community in America" Washington DC: Gallaudet University Press
 Gallaudet, Edward Miner, 1881, The Milan Convention,  American Annals of the Deaf, Vol. XXVI., No. 1., January 1881, pp. 1–16.
 Kyle, James; Woll, Bencie (1985) "Sign Language: The Study of Deaf People and Their Language": Cambridge University Press
 Oakling (2007) "Milan Conference" 
 Sturley, N (2003).  Milan 1880: The Historical Facts

External links 

 Milan Conference in 1880

Deafness
Deaf culture
1880 in Europe
1880 in Italy
1880 conferences
History of Milan
Alexander Graham Bell
Education for the deaf
Deaf education
Special education
19th century in Milan
Education events